Øksnevad is a surname. Notable people with the surname include:

Reidar Øksnevad (1884–1958), Norwegian journalist, bibliographer, and librarian
Toralv Øksnevad (1891–1975), Norwegian politician, journalist, newspaper editor, and radio personality

Norwegian-language surnames